In mathematics, a square triangular number (or triangular square number) is a number which is both a triangular number and a perfect square. There are infinitely many square triangular numbers; the first few are:
0, 1, 36,

Explicit formulas

Define the triangular root of a triangular number  to be . From this definition and the quadratic formula,

Therefore,  is triangular ( is an integer) if and only if  is square. Consequently, a square number  is also triangular if and only if  is square, that is, there are numbers  and  such that . If  denotes the th nontrivial solution to any Pell equation for a particular , it can be shown by the method of descent that

Hence there are an infinity of solutions to any Pell equation for which there is one non-trivial one, which holds whenever  is not a square. The first non-trivial solution when  is easy to find: it is (3,1). A solution  to the Pell equation for  yields a square triangular number and its square and triangular roots as follows:

In 1778 Leonhard Euler determined the explicit formula

Other equivalent formulas (obtained by expanding this formula) that may be convenient include
 

Pell's equation
The problem of finding square triangular numbers reduces to Pell's equation in the following way.

Every triangular number is of the form . Therefore we seek integers ,  such that

Rearranging, this becomes

which is an instance of Pell's equation. This particular equation is solved by the Pell numbers  as

and therefore all solutions are given by

There are many identities about the Pell numbers, and these translate into identities about the square triangular numbers.

Recurrence relations

There are recurrence relations for the square triangular numbers, as well as for the sides of the square and triangle involved.  We have

We have

Other characterizations

A. V. Sylwester gave a short proof that there are an infinity of square triangular numbers: If the th triangular number  is square, then so is the larger th triangular number, since:

As the product of three squares, the right hand side is square. The triangular roots  are alternately simultaneously one less than a square and twice a square if  is even, and simultaneously a square and one less than twice a square if  is odd. Thus,
49 = 72 = 2 × 52 − 1,
288 = 172 − 1 = 2 × 122, and
1681 = 412 = 2 × 292 − 1.

Additionally:

In other words, the difference between two consecutive square triangular numbers is the square root of another square triangular number.

The generating function for the square triangular numbers is:

Numerical data

As  becomes larger, the ratio  approaches  ≈ , and the ratio of successive square triangular numbers approaches   ≈ .

{| class="wikitable" border="1" style="text-align:right"
|-
! 
! 
! 
! 
!rowspan=2 valign=top| 
!rowspan=3 valign=top| 
|-
|0
|0
|0
|0
|-
|1
|1
|1
|1
|align=left|1
|-
|2
|36
|6
|8
|align=left|
|align=left|36
|-
|3
|
|35
|49
|align=left|1.4
|align=left|
|-
|4
|
|204
|288
|align=left|
|align=left|
|-
|5
|
|
|
|align=left|
|align=left|
|-
|6
|
|
|
|align=left|
|align=left|
|-
|7
|
|
|
|align=left|
|align=left|
|-
|8
|
|
|
|align=left|
|align=left|
|-
|9
|
|
|
|align=left|
|align=left|
|-
|10
|
|
|
|align=left|
|align=left|
|-
|11
|
|
|
|align=left|
|align=left|
|}

See also
Cannonball problem, on numbers that are simultaneously square and square pyramidal
Sixth power, numbers that are simultaneously square and cubical

Notes

External links
 Triangular numbers that are also square at cut-the-knot
 
 Michael Dummett's solution

Figurate numbers
Integer sequences